The Heidelberg Academy of Sciences and Humanities (German: Heidelberger Akademie der Wissenschaften), established in 1909 in Heidelberg, Germany, is an assembly of scholars and scientists in the German state of Baden-Wuerttemberg.

The Academy is a member of the Union of German Academies of Sciences and Humanities.

References

External links
Heidelberg Academy of Sciences and Humanities website 

1909 establishments in Germany
Scientific organizations established in 1909
Union of German Academies of Sciences and Humanities
Education in Heidelberg